CHYK may refer to:

 CHYK-FM, a radio station (104.1 FM) licensed to Timmins, Ontario, Canada
 Chinmaya Yuva Kendra